Live at the On Broadway 1982 is a live album by the hardcore punk band Black Flag. The album features 2 separate live performances from the band performing at the On Broadway venue July 23–24, 1982. It is the only official Black Flag release to feature Chuck Biscuits on drums.

Track listing

Personnel
Henry Rollins – vocals
Greg Ginn – lead guitar, rhythm guitar on "No Martyrs"
Dez Cadena – rhythm guitar, lead guitar on "No Martyrs", backing vocals
Chuck Dukowski – bass, backing vocals
Chuck Biscuits – drums

Black Flag (band) live albums
2010 live albums